Gloomy Salad Days (死神少女; pinyin: Sǐ Shén Shào Nǚ) is a 2010 Taiwanese television series starring Aaron Yan and Serena Fang. The first episode aired on Saturday, October 9, 2010 at 9 p.m. on PTS Channel; two episodes were broadcast back-to-back every week.

Synopsis
The drama consists of 12 different stories of teenagers based on real life social cases. The main character is Du the Death Girl, guardian of the bridge called the "Nai He Qiao"; she is the Chinese equivalent of Charon, and the river under her bridge is the Chinese equivalent of the Styx.

The bridge is crumbling and its masonry is eroding, so Du sets off to repair the bridge; she seeks people who are willing to be turned into a rock in exchange for a wish. Du can only be summoned when a particular person has a rock from the bridge and is in such despair that they wish to die. However Shen Qi, who has a brain tumor, can see Du even without desiring death nor possessing a rock. After he learns that Du took Huang He away, Shen Qi tries to save people from Du and prevent her from taking their lives away.

Shen Qi slowly becomes curious about Du and tries to find out who she was in her previous life. He discovers that in Du's previous life she was a girl named Du He, whose Death Girl comic won first place in a competition. Another competitor named Gao Chao had substituted his best work for an inferior one to give Du He a better chance at winning the prize money, because she needed it more.

Not long after, Gao Chao proposes to Du He and they get married. Their marriage angers Du He's brother Du Ji, who is in love with his own sister. One night, Du Ji gets drunk and uses a wooden plank to hit Gao Chao, causing him to fall into a pool. Du He, shocked, comes out screaming for Gao Chao. Du Ji tries to calm her down and tells her the reasons for his actions. Du He reveals that she feels the same way as Du Ji does; however she does not wish to wrong Gao Chao and jumps into the pool. With the thought that her existence only brings tragedy to the world, she becomes brain dead and falls into deep coma. Gao Chao recovers but Du He does not; he flies to alone to Japan and becomes engaged to another woman.

Shen Qi, who started out pitying Du, begins to love her and Du comes to love him too. When Shen Qi's father learns that Shen Qi has a brain tumor, he immediately plans for it to be operated upon. However Shen Qi does not wish to have the tumor removed, as he knows that once removed he will never be able to see Du in this life again. Can the lovers be together though they are from two different worlds, or will they be forever separated?

Episodes

Cast

Main

Supporting and guest cast

* represents guest star

Production
Gloomy Salad Days was filmed at the National Dongshih Industrial High School at Taichung, Taiwan (國立東勢高工; pinyin: guó lì dōng shì gāo gōng). For the filming of this drama, the school's name was changed to 石雨高校 (pinyin: shí yǔ gāo xiào).

Broadcasting info

Taiwan
Broadcast period: 9 October 2010 - 11 December 2010Day: Every SaturdayTime: 2100 - 2300Channel: PTS Channel 13 (公視１３頻道)Repeats: Saturday (1300 - 1500)

Malaysia 
Broadcast period: 23 November 2010 - 20 December 2010Day: Monday - FridayTime: 2230 - 2330Channel: Astro Shuang Xing Channel 324 (ＡＳＴＲＯ雙星　324頻道)Repeats: Monday - Friday (2130 - 2230); Saturday (1230 - 1630)

Ratings (PTS)

Other media

Gloomy Salad Days Original Soundtrack 《死神少女》電視原聲帶
 Released on 19 November 2010 by Rock Records.

Opening Theme
 Song Title: Gloomy Salad Days
 Lyricist: Guo Jin Ru (郭晉汝)
 Composer: ARNY, Mumu
 Singer: Wan Fang (萬芳)

Ending Theme
 Song Title: Du (渡)
 Lyricist: Guo Jin Ru (郭晉汝)
 Composer: ARNY, Mumu
 Singer: Wan Fang (萬芳)

Gloomy Salad Days DVD 《死神少女》DVD
 Release date: 25 December 2010
 Can be pre-ordered in Taiwan.

Publications

Gloomy Salad Days Novel (死神少女 電視小說)
 Author: Xia Fei (夏霏)
 Release date: 11 October 2010
 Publisher: Booker Publications (布克文化)

Gloomy Salad Days Manga (死神少女 漫畫)
 Publisher: Tong Li Comics (東立出版社)

Gloomy Salad Days Pictorial Book (死神少女 寫真書)
 Publisher: Booker Publications (布克文化)
 Release date: 16 November 2010

News
 27.04.2010 Director Zero Chou shares "Death Girl filming concept (In CHI).
 27.04.2010 Aaron Yan and Serena Fang have a ghostly romance mid-air.
 28.04.2010 Peter Ho shows support as guest star, seeing Aaron Yan, turns into an incestuous psycho.
 28.04.2010 Aaron Yan's brain tumor gives him the sixth sense, Wu Chun's migraine helps out.
 31.07.2010 Death Girl will air at PTS on 18 September.
 02.08.2010 Aaron Yan rushing drama had not shut eye in 24 hours.
 20.08.2010 Aaron injured on Gloomy Salad Days's set.(In CHI)
 "Death Girl," staged a "close contact body struggle scene" with Aaron.
 Aaron Yan & Serena Fang's Bed Scene Makes Director Blush.

References

External links
 Gloomy Salad Days PTS Website.
 Gloomy Salad Days at Fahrenheit Globa1.

Taiwanese drama television series
Public Television Service original programming